Senator Madigan may refer to:

Colleen Madigan (born 1964), Maine State Senate
Lisa Madigan (born 1966), Illinois State Senate
Robert Madigan (1942–2006), Illinois State Senate
Roger A. Madigan (1930–2018), Pennsylvania State Senate